China, officially the People's Republic of China (PRC), is a country in East Asia. It is the world's most populous country, with a population exceeding 1.4 billion, slightly ahead of India. China spans the equivalent of five time zones and borders fourteen countries by land, the most of any country in the world, tied with Russia. The country consists of 22 provinces, five autonomous regions, four municipalities, and two special administrative regions (Hong Kong and Macau). The national capital is Beijing, and the most populous city and largest financial center is Shanghai.

Modern Chinese trace their origins to a cradle of civilization in the fertile basin of the Yellow River in the North China Plain. The semi-legendary Xia dynasty in the 21st century BCE and the well-attested Shang and Zhou dynasties developed a bureaucratic political system to serve hereditary monarchies, or dynasties. Chinese writing, Chinese classic literature, and the Hundred Schools of Thought emerged during this period and influenced China and its neighbors for centuries to come. In the third century BCE, Qin Shi Huang founded the first Chinese empire, the short-lived Qin dynasty. The Qin was followed by the more stable Han dynasty (206 BCE–220 CE), which established a model for nearly two millennia in which the Chinese empire was one of the world's foremost economic powers. The empire expanded, fractured, and reunified; was conquered and reestablished; absorbed foreign religions and ideas; and made world-leading scientific advances, such as the Four Great Inventions: gunpowder, paper, the compass, and printing. After centuries of disunity following the fall of the Han, the Sui (581–618) and Tang (618–907) dynasties reunified the empire. The multi-ethnic Tang welcomed foreign trade and culture that came over the Silk Road and adapted Buddhism to Chinese needs. The early modern Song dynasty (960–1279) became increasingly urban and commercial. The civilian scholar-officials or literati used the examination system and  the doctrines of Neo-Confucianism to replace the military aristocrats of earlier dynasties. The Mongol invasion established the Yuan dynasty in 1279, but the Ming dynasty (1368–1644) re-established Han Chinese control. The Manchu-led Qing dynasty nearly doubled the empire's territory and established a multi-ethnic state that was the basis of the modern Chinese nation, but suffered heavy losses to foreign imperialism in the 19th century.

The Chinese monarchy collapsed in 1912 with the Xinhai Revolution, when the Republic of China (ROC) replaced the Qing dynasty. In its early years as a republic, the country underwent a period of instability known as the Warlord Era before mostly reunifying in 1928 under a Nationalist government. A civil war between the nationalist Kuomintang (KMT) and the Chinese Communist Party (CCP) began in 1927. Japan invaded China in 1937, starting the Second Sino-Japanese War and temporarily halting the civil war. The surrender and expulsion of Japanese forces from China in 1945 left a power vacuum in the country, which led to renewed fighting between the CCP and the Kuomintang. The civil war ended in 1949 with the division of Chinese territory; the CCP established the People's Republic of China on the mainland while the Kuomintang-led ROC government retreated to the island of Taiwan. Both claim to be the sole legitimate government of China, although the United Nations has recognized the PRC as the sole representation since 1971. From 1959 to 1961, the PRC implemented an economic and social campaign called the "Great Leap Forward" that resulted in a sharp economic decline and an estimated 15 to 55 million deaths, mostly through man-made famine. From 1966 to 1976, the turbulent period of political and social chaos within China known as the Cultural Revolution led to greater economic and educational decline, with millions being purged or subjected to either persecution or "politicide" based on political categories. Since then, the Chinese government has rebuked some of the earlier Maoist policies, conducting a series of political and economic reforms since 1978 that have greatly raised Chinese standards of living, and increased life expectancies.

China is currently governed as a unitary Marxist–Leninist one-party socialist republic by the CCP. China is a permanent member of the United Nations Security Council and a founding member of several multilateral and regional cooperation organizations such as the Asian Infrastructure Investment Bank, the Silk Road Fund, the New Development Bank, the Shanghai Cooperation Organisation, and the RCEP. It is also a member of the BRICS, the G8+5, the G20, the APEC, and the East Asia Summit. It ranks among the lowest in measurements of democracy, civil liberties, government transparency, freedom of the press, freedom of religion, and the human rights of ethnic minorities. The Chinese authorities have been criticized by human rights activists and non-governmental organizations for human rights abuses, including political repression, mass censorship, mass surveillance of their citizens, and violent suppression of protest and dissent.

Making up around one-fifth of the world economy, China is the world's largest economy by GDP at purchasing power parity, the second-largest economy by nominal GDP, and the second-wealthiest country. The country is one of the fastest-growing major economies and is the world's largest manufacturer and exporter, as well as the second-largest importer. China is a recognized nuclear-weapon state with the world's largest standing army by military personnel and the second-largest defense budget. China is considered to be a potential superpower due to its high level of innovation, economic potential, growing military strength, and influence in international affairs.

Etymology 

The word "China" has been used in English since the 16th century; however, it was not a word used by the Chinese themselves during this period. Its origin has been traced through Portuguese, Malay, and Persian back to the Sanskrit word Chīna, used in ancient India. "China" appears in Richard Eden's 1555 translation of the 1516 journal of the Portuguese explorer Duarte Barbosa. Barbosa's usage was derived from Persian Chīn, which was in turn derived from Sanskrit Cīna. Cīna was first used in early Hindu scripture, including the Mahābhārata (5th century BCE) and the Laws of Manu (2nd century BCE). In 1655, Martino Martini suggested that the word China is derived ultimately from the name of the Qin dynasty (221–206 BCE). Although usage in Indian sources precedes this dynasty, this derivation is still given in various sources. The origin of the Sanskrit word is a matter of debate, according to the Oxford English Dictionary. Alternative suggestions include the names for Yelang and the Jing or Chu state.
The official name of the modern state is the "People's Republic of China". It was then applied to the area around Luoyi (present-day Luoyang) during the Eastern Zhou and then to China's Central Plain before being used as an occasional synonym for the state under the Qing. It was often used as a cultural concept to distinguish the Huaxia people from perceived "barbarians". China (PRC) is sometimes referred to as the Mainland when distinguishing the ROC from the PRC.

History

Prehistory 

China is regarded as one of the world's oldest civilisations. Archaeological evidence suggests that early hominids inhabited the country 2.25 million years ago. The hominid fossils of Peking Man, a Homo erectus who used fire, were discovered in a cave at Zhoukoudian near Beijing; they have been dated to between 680,000 and 780,000 years ago. The fossilized teeth of Homo sapiens (dated to 125,000–80,000 years ago) have been discovered in Fuyan Cave in Dao County, Hunan. Chinese proto-writing existed in Jiahu around 6600 BCE, at Damaidi around 6000 BCE, Dadiwan from 5800 to 5400 BCE, and Banpo dating from the 5th millennium BCE. Some scholars have suggested that the Jiahu symbols (7th millennium BCE) constituted the earliest Chinese writing system.

Early dynastic rule 

According to Chinese tradition, the first dynasty was the Xia, which emerged around 2100 BCE. The Xia dynasty marked the beginning of China's political system based on hereditary monarchies, or dynasties, which lasted for a millennium. The Xia dynasty was considered mythical by historians until scientific excavations found early Bronze Age sites at Erlitou, Henan in 1959. It remains unclear whether these sites are the remains of the Xia dynasty or of another culture from the same period. The succeeding Shang dynasty is the earliest to be confirmed by contemporary records. The Shang ruled the plain of the Yellow River in eastern China from the 17th to the 11th century BCE. Their oracle bone script (from  BCE) represents the oldest form of Chinese writing yet found and is a direct ancestor of modern Chinese characters.

The Shang was conquered by the Zhou, who ruled between the 11th and 5th centuries BCE, though centralized authority was slowly eroded by feudal warlords. Some principalities eventually emerged from the weakened Zhou, no longer fully obeyed the Zhou king, and continually waged war with each other during the 300-year Spring and Autumn period. By the time of the Warring States period of the 5th–3rd centuries BCE, there were only seven powerful states left.

Imperial China 

The Warring States period ended in 221 BCE after the state of Qin conquered the other six kingdoms, reunited China and established the dominant order of autocracy. King Zheng of Qin proclaimed himself the First Emperor of the Qin dynasty. He enacted Qin's legalist reforms throughout China, notably the forced standardization of Chinese characters, measurements, road widths (i.e., the cart axles' length), and currency. His dynasty also conquered the Yue tribes in Guangxi, Guangdong, and Vietnam. The Qin dynasty lasted only fifteen years, falling soon after the First Emperor's death, as his harsh authoritarian policies led to widespread rebellion.

Following a widespread civil war during which the imperial library at Xianyang was burned, the Han dynasty emerged to rule China between 206 BCE and CE 220, creating a cultural identity among its populace still remembered in the ethnonym of the Han Chinese. The Han expanded the empire's territory considerably, with military campaigns reaching Central Asia, Mongolia, South Korea, and Yunnan, and the recovery of Guangdong and northern Vietnam from Nanyue. Han involvement in Central Asia and Sogdia helped establish the land route of the Silk Road, replacing the earlier path over the Himalayas to India. Han China gradually became the largest economy of the ancient world. Despite the Han's initial decentralization and the official abandonment of the Qin philosophy of Legalism in favor of Confucianism, Qin's legalist institutions and policies continued to be employed by the Han government and its successors.

After the end of the Han dynasty, a period of strife known as Three Kingdoms followed, whose central figures were later immortalized in one of the Four Classics of Chinese literature. At its end, Wei was swiftly overthrown by the Jin dynasty. The Jin fell to civil war upon the ascension of a developmentally disabled emperor; the Five Barbarians then invaded and ruled northern China as the Sixteen States. The Xianbei unified them as the Northern Wei, whose Emperor Xiaowen reversed his predecessors' apartheid policies and enforced a drastic sinification on his subjects, largely integrating them into Chinese culture. In the south, the general Liu Yu secured the abdication of the Jin in favor of the Liu Song. The various successors of these states became known as the Northern and Southern dynasties, with the two areas finally reunited by the Sui in 581. The Sui restored the Han to power through China, reformed its agriculture, economy and imperial examination system, constructed the Grand Canal, and patronized Buddhism. However, they fell quickly when their conscription for public works and a failed war in northern Korea provoked widespread unrest.

Under the succeeding Tang and Song dynasties, Chinese economy, technology, and culture entered a golden age. The Tang dynasty retained control of the Western Regions and the Silk Road, which brought traders to as far as Mesopotamia and the Horn of Africa, and made the capital Chang'an a cosmopolitan urban center. However, it was devastated and weakened by the An Lushan Rebellion in the 8th century. In 907, the Tang disintegrated completely when the local military governors became ungovernable. The Song dynasty ended the separatist situation in 960, leading to a balance of power between the Song and Khitan Liao. The Song was the first government in world history to issue paper money and the first Chinese polity to establish a permanent standing navy which was supported by the developed shipbuilding industry along with the sea trade.

Between the 10th and 11th centuries, the population of China doubled in size to around 100 million people, mostly because of the expansion of rice cultivation in central and southern China, and the production of abundant food surpluses. The Song dynasty also saw a revival of Confucianism, in response to the growth of Buddhism during the Tang, and a flourishing of philosophy and the arts, as landscape art and porcelain were brought to new levels of maturity and complexity. However, the military weakness of the Song army was observed by the Jurchen Jin dynasty. In 1127, Emperor Huizong of Song and the capital Bianjing were captured during the Jin–Song Wars. The remnants of the Song retreated to southern China.

The Mongol conquest of China began in 1205 with the gradual conquest of Western Xia by Genghis Khan, who also invaded Jin territories. In 1271, the Mongol leader Kublai Khan established the Yuan dynasty, which conquered the last remnant of the Song dynasty in 1279. Before the Mongol invasion, the population of Song China was 120 million citizens; this was reduced to 60 million by the time of the census in 1300. A peasant named Zhu Yuanzhang led a rebellion that overthrew the Yuan in 1368 and founded the Ming dynasty as the Hongwu Emperor. Under the Ming dynasty, China enjoyed another golden age, developing one of the strongest navies in the world and a rich and prosperous economy amid a flourishing of art and culture. It was during this period that admiral Zheng He led the Ming treasure voyages throughout the Indian Ocean, reaching as far as East Africa.

In the early years of the Ming dynasty, China's capital was moved from Nanjing to Beijing. With the budding of capitalism, philosophers such as Wang Yangming further critiqued and expanded Neo-Confucianism with concepts of individualism and equality of four occupations. The scholar-official stratum became a supporting force of industry and commerce in the tax boycott movements, which, together with the famines and defense against Japanese invasions of Korea (1592–1598) and Manchu invasions led to an exhausted treasury. In 1644, Beijing was captured by a coalition of peasant rebel forces led by Li Zicheng. The Chongzhen Emperor committed suicide when the city fell. The Manchu Qing dynasty, then allied with Ming dynasty general Wu Sangui, overthrew Li's short-lived Shun dynasty and subsequently seized control of Beijing, which became the new capital of the Qing dynasty.

The Qing dynasty, which lasted from 1644 until 1912, was the last imperial dynasty of China. Its conquest of the Ming (1618–1683) cost 25 million lives and the economy of China shrank drastically. After the Southern Ming ended, the further conquest of the Dzungar Khanate added Mongolia, Tibet and Xinjiang to the empire. The centralized autocracy was strengthened to suppress anti-Qing sentiment with the policy of valuing agriculture and restraining commerce, the Haijin ("sea ban"), and ideological control as represented by the literary inquisition, causing social and technological stagnation.

Fall of the Qing dynasty 

In the mid-19th century, the Qing dynasty experienced Western imperialism in the Opium Wars with Britain and France. China was forced to pay compensation, open treaty ports, allow extraterritoriality for foreign nationals, and cede Hong Kong to the British under the 1842 Treaty of Nanking, the first of the Unequal Treaties. The First Sino-Japanese War (1894–1895) resulted in Qing China's loss of influence in the Korean Peninsula, as well as the cession of Taiwan to Japan.
The Qing dynasty also began experiencing internal unrest in which tens of millions of people died, especially in the White Lotus Rebellion, the failed Taiping Rebellion that ravaged southern China in the 1850s and 1860s and the Dungan Revolt (1862–1877) in the northwest. The initial success of the Self-Strengthening Movement of the 1860s was frustrated by a series of military defeats in the 1880s and 1890s.

In the 19th century, the great Chinese diaspora began. Losses due to emigration were added to by conflicts and catastrophes such as the Northern Chinese Famine of 1876–1879, in which between 9 and 13 million people died. The Guangxu Emperor drafted a reform plan in 1898 to establish a modern constitutional monarchy, but these plans were thwarted by the Empress Dowager Cixi. The ill-fated anti-foreign Boxer Rebellion of 1899–1901 further weakened the dynasty. Although Cixi sponsored a program of reforms, the Xinhai Revolution of 1911–1912 brought an end to the Qing dynasty and established the Republic of China. Puyi, the last Emperor of China, abdicated in 1912.

Establishment of the Republic and World War II 

On 1 January 1912, the Republic of China was established, and Sun Yat-sen of the Kuomintang (the KMT or Nationalist Party) was proclaimed provisional president. On 12 February 1912, regent Empress Dowager Longyu sealed the imperial abdication decree on behalf of 4 year old Puyi, the last emperor of China, ending 5,000 years of monarchy in China. In March 1912, the presidency was given to Yuan Shikai, a former Qing general who in 1915 proclaimed himself Emperor of China. In the face of popular condemnation and opposition from his own Beiyang Army, he was forced to abdicate and re-establish the republic in 1916.

After Yuan Shikai's death in 1916, China was politically fragmented. Its Beijing-based government was internationally recognized but virtually powerless; regional warlords controlled most of its territory. In the late 1920s, the Kuomintang under Chiang Kai-shek, the then Principal of the Republic of China Military Academy, was able to reunify the country under its own control with a series of deft military and political maneuverings, known collectively as the Northern Expedition. The Kuomintang moved the nation's capital to Nanjing and implemented "political tutelage", an intermediate stage of political development outlined in Sun Yat-sen's San-min program for transforming China into a modern democratic state. The political division in China made it difficult for Chiang to battle the communist-led People's Liberation Army (PLA), against whom the Kuomintang had been warring since 1927 in the Chinese Civil War. This war continued successfully for the Kuomintang, especially after the PLA retreated in the Long March, until Japanese aggression and the 1936 Xi'an Incident forced Chiang to confront Imperial Japan.

The Second Sino-Japanese War (1937–1945), a theater of World War II, forced an uneasy alliance between the Kuomintang and the Communists. Japanese forces committed numerous war atrocities against the civilian population; in all, as many as 20 million Chinese civilians died. An estimated 40,000 to 300,000 Chinese were massacred in the city of Nanjing alone during the Japanese occupation. During the war, China, along with the UK, the United States, and the Soviet Union, were referred to as "trusteeship of the powerful" and were recognized as the Allied "Big Four" in the Declaration by United Nations. Along with the other three great powers, China was one of the four major Allies of World War II, and was later considered one of the primary victors in the war. After the surrender of Japan in 1945, Taiwan, including the Pescadores, was handed over to Chinese control. However, the validity of this handover is controversial, in that whether Taiwan's sovereignty was legally transferred and whether China is a legitimate recipient, due to complex issues that arose from the handling of Japan's surrender, resulting in the unresolved political status of Taiwan, which is a flashpoint of potential war between China and Taiwan. China emerged victorious but war-ravaged and financially drained. The continued distrust between the Kuomintang and the Communists led to the resumption of civil war. Constitutional rule was established in 1947, but because of the ongoing unrest, many provisions of the ROC constitution were never implemented in mainland China.

Civil War and the People's Republic 

Before the existence of the People's Republic, the CCP had declared several areas of the country as the Chinese Soviet Republic (Jiangxi Soviet), a predecessor state to the PRC, in November 1931 in Ruijin, Jiangxi. The Jiangxi Soviet was wiped out by the KMT armies in 1934 and was relocated to Yan'an in Shaanxi where the Long March concluded in 1935. It would be the base of the communists before major combat in the Chinese Civil War ended in 1949. Afterwards, the CCP took control of most of mainland China, and the Kuomintang retreating offshore to Taiwan, reducing its territory to only Taiwan, Hainan, and their surrounding islands.

On 1 October 1949, CCP Chairman Mao Zedong formally proclaimed the establishment of the People's Republic of China at the new nation's founding ceremony and inaugural military parade in Tiananmen Square, Beijing. In 1950, the People's Liberation Army captured Hainan from the ROC and annexed Tibet. However, remaining Kuomintang forces continued to wage an insurgency in western China throughout the 1950s.

The government consolidated its popularity among the peasants through land reform, which included the execution of between 1 and 2 million landlords. China developed an independent industrial system and its own nuclear weapons. The Chinese population increased from 550 million in 1950 to 900 million in 1974. However, the Great Leap Forward, an idealistic massive reform project, resulted in an estimated 15 to 55 million deaths between 1959 and 1961, mostly from starvation. In 1964, China's first atomic bomb exploded successfully. In 1966, Mao and his allies launched the Cultural Revolution, sparking a decade of political recrimination and social upheaval that lasted until Mao's death in 1976. In October 1971, the PRC replaced the Republic of China in the United Nations, and took its seat as a permanent member of the Security Council. This UN action also created the problem of the political status of Taiwan and the Two Chinas issue.

Reforms and contemporary history 

After Mao's death, the Gang of Four was quickly arrested by Hua Guofeng and held responsible for the excesses of the Cultural Revolution. Deng Xiaoping took power in 1978, and instituted significant economic reforms. The CCP loosened governmental control over citizens' personal lives, and the communes were gradually disbanded in favor of working contracted to households. Agricultural collectivization was dismantled and farmlands privatized, while foreign trade became a major new focus, leading to the creation of Special Economic Zones (SEZs). Inefficient state-owned enterprises (SOEs) were restructured and unprofitable ones were closed outright, resulting in massive job losses. This marked China's transition from a planned economy to a mixed economy with an increasingly open-market environment. China adopted its current constitution on 4 December 1982. In 1989, the suppression of student protests in Tiananmen Square brought condemnations and sanctions against the Chinese government from various foreign countries.
Jiang Zemin, Li Peng and Zhu Rongji led the nation in the 1990s. Under their administration, China's economic performance pulled an estimated 150 million peasants out of poverty and sustained an average annual gross domestic product growth rate of 11.2%. British Hong Kong and Portuguese Macau returned to China in 1997 and 1999, respectively, as the Hong Kong and Macau special administrative regions under the principle of One country, two systems. The country joined the World Trade Organization in 2001, and maintained its high rate of economic growth under Hu Jintao and Wen Jiabao's leadership in the 2000s. However, the growth also severely impacted the country's resources and environment, and caused major social displacement.

CCP general secretary Xi Jinping has ruled since 2012 and has pursued large-scale efforts to reform China's economy (which has suffered from structural instabilities and slowing growth), and has also reformed the one-child policy and penal system, as well as instituting a vast anti-corruption crackdown. In the early 2010s, China's economic growth rate began to slow amid domestic credit troubles, weakening international demand for Chinese exports and fragility in the global economy. In 2013, China initiated the Belt and Road Initiative, a global infrastructure investment project. Since 2017, the Chinese government has been engaged in a harsh crackdown in Xinjiang, with an estimated one million people, mostly Uyghurs but including other ethnic and religious minorities, in internment camps. The National People's Congress in 2018 altered the country's constitution to remove the two-term limit on holding the Presidency of China, permitting the current leader, Xi Jinping, to remain president of China (and general secretary of the CCP) for an unlimited time, earning criticism for creating dictatorial governance. In 2020, the Standing Committee of the National People's Congress (NPCSC) passed a national security law in Hong Kong that gave the Hong Kong government wide-ranging tools to crack down on dissent. In December 2019, the COVID-19 pandemic began with an outbreak in Wuhan; after three years of strict public health measures indented to completely eradicate the virus, mounting social and economic pressures compelled the government to loosen restrictions in December 2022.

Geography 

China's landscape is vast and diverse, ranging from the Gobi and Taklamakan Deserts in the arid north to the subtropical forests in the wetter south. The Himalaya, Karakoram, Pamir and Tian Shan mountain ranges separate China from much of South and Central Asia. The Yangtze and Yellow Rivers, the third- and sixth-longest in the world, respectively, run from the Tibetan Plateau to the densely populated eastern seaboard. China connects through the Kazakh border to the Eurasian Steppe which has been an artery of communication between East and West since the Neolithic through the Steppe Route – the ancestor of the terrestrial Silk Road(s).

China's landscapes vary significantly across its vast territory. In the east, along the shores of the Yellow Sea and the East China Sea, there are extensive and densely populated alluvial plains, while on the edges of the Inner Mongolian plateau in the north, broad grasslands predominate. Southern China is dominated by hills and low mountain ranges, while the central-east hosts the deltas of China's two major rivers, the Yellow River and the Yangtze River. Other major rivers include the Xi, Mekong, Brahmaputra and Amur. To the west sit major mountain ranges, most notably the Himalayas. High plateaus feature among the more arid landscapes of the north, such as the Taklamakan and the Gobi Desert. The world's highest point, Mount Everest (8,848 m), lies on the Sino-Nepalese border. The country's lowest point, and the world's third-lowest, is the dried lake bed of Ayding Lake (−154 m) in the Turpan Depression.

Climate 

China's climate is mainly dominated by dry seasons and wet monsoons, which lead to pronounced temperature differences between winter and summer. In the winter, northern winds coming from high-latitude areas are cold and dry; in summer, southern winds from coastal areas at lower latitudes are warm and moist.

A major environmental issue in China is the continued expansion of its deserts, particularly the Gobi Desert. Although barrier tree lines planted since the 1970s have reduced the frequency of sandstorms, prolonged drought and poor agricultural practices have resulted in dust storms plaguing northern China each spring, which then spread to other parts of East Asia, including Japan and Korea. Water quality, erosion, and pollution control have become important issues in China's relations with other countries. Melting glaciers in the Himalayas could potentially lead to water shortages for hundreds of millions of people. According to academics, in order to limit climate change in China to  electricity generation from coal in China without carbon capture must be phased out by 2045. Official government statistics about Chinese agricultural productivity are considered unreliable, due to exaggeration of production at subsidiary government levels. Much of China has a climate very suitable for agriculture and the country has been the world's largest producer of rice, wheat, tomatoes, eggplant, grapes, watermelon, spinach, and many other crops.

Biodiversity 

China is one of 17 megadiverse countries, lying in two of the world's major biogeographic realms: the Palearctic and the Indomalayan. By one measure, China has over 34,687 species of animals and vascular plants, making it the third-most biodiverse country in the world, after Brazil and Colombia. The country signed the Rio de Janeiro Convention on Biological Diversity on 11 June 1992, and became a party to the convention on 5 January 1993. It later produced a National Biodiversity Strategy and Action Plan, with one revision that was received by the convention on 21 September 2010.

China is home to at least 551 species of mammals (the third-highest such number in the world), 1,221 species of birds (eighth), 424 species of reptiles (seventh) and 333 species of amphibians (seventh). Wildlife in China shares habitat with, and bears acute pressure from, the world's largest population of humans. At least 840 animal species are threatened, vulnerable or in danger of local extinction in China, due mainly to human activity such as habitat destruction, pollution and poaching for food, fur and ingredients for traditional Chinese medicine. Most wild animals have been eliminated from the core agricultural regions of east and central China, but they have fared better in the mountainous south and west. The Baiji was confirmed extinct on 12 December 2006.

China has over 32,000 species of vascular plants, and is home to a variety of forest types. Cold coniferous forests predominate in the north of the country, supporting animal species such as moose and Asian black bear, along with over 120 bird species. The understory of moist conifer forests may contain thickets of bamboo. In higher montane stands of juniper and yew, the bamboo is replaced by rhododendrons. Subtropical forests, which are predominate in central and southern China, support a high density of plant species including numerous rare endemics. Tropical and seasonal rainforests, though confined to Yunnan and Hainan Island, contain a quarter of all the animal and plant species found in China. China has over 10,000 recorded species of fungi, and of them, nearly 6,000 are higher fungi.

Environment 

In the early 2000s, China has suffered from environmental deterioration and pollution due to its rapid pace of industrialization. While regulations such as the 1979 Environmental Protection Law are fairly stringent, they are poorly enforced, as they are frequently disregarded by local communities and government officials in favor of rapid economic development. China is the country with the second highest death toll because of air pollution, after India. There are approximately 1 million deaths caused by exposure to ambient air pollution. Although China ranks as the highest CO2 emitting country in the world, it only emits 8 tons of CO2 per capita, significantly lower than developed countries such as the United States (16.1), Australia (16.8) and South Korea (13.6).

In recent years, China has clamped down on pollution. In March 2014, CCP General Secretary Xi Jinping "declared war" on pollution during the opening of the National People's Congress. After extensive debate lasting nearly two years, the parliament approved a new environmental law in April. The new law empowers environmental enforcement agencies with great punitive power and large fines for offenders, defines areas which require extra protection, and gives independent environmental groups more ability to operate in the country. In 2020, Chinese Communist Party general secretary Xi Jinping announced that China aims to peak emissions before 2030 and go carbon-neutral by 2060 in accordance with the Paris climate accord. According to Climate Action Tracker, if accomplished it would lower the expected rise in global temperature by 0.2 – 0.3 degrees – "the biggest single reduction ever estimated by the Climate Action Tracker". In September 2021 Xi Jinping announced that China will not build "coal-fired power projects abroad". The decision can be "pivotal" in reducing emissions. The Belt and Road Initiative did not include financing such projects already in the first half of 2021.

The country also had significant water pollution problems: 8.2% of China's rivers had been polluted by industrial and agricultural waste in 2019. China had a 2018 Forest Landscape Integrity Index mean score of 7.14/10, ranking it 53rd globally out of 172 countries. In 2020, a sweeping law was passed by the Chinese government to protect the ecology of the Yangtze River. The new laws include strengthening ecological protection rules for hydropower projects along the river, banning chemical plants within 1 kilometer of the river, relocating polluting industries, severely restricting sand mining as well as a complete fishing ban on all the natural waterways of the river, including all its major tributaries and lakes.

China is also the world's leading investor in renewable energy and its commercialization, with $52 billion invested in 2011 alone; it is a major manufacturer of renewable energy technologies and invests heavily in local-scale renewable energy projects. By 2015, over 24% of China's energy was derived from renewable sources, while most notably from hydroelectric power: a total installed capacity of 197 GW makes China the largest hydroelectric power producer in the world. China also has the largest power capacity of installed solar photovoltaics system and wind power system in the world. Greenhouse gas emissions by China are the world's largest, as is renewable energy in China. Despite its emphasis on renewables, China remains deeply connected to global oil markets and next to India, has been the largest importer of Russian crude oil in 2022.

Political geography 

The People's Republic of China is the second-largest country in the world by land area after Russia. Specific area figures range from  according to the Encyclopædia Britannica, to  according to the UN Demographic Yearbook, and the CIA World Factbook.

China borders 14 nations and covers the bulk of East Asia, bordering Vietnam, Laos, and Myanmar in Southeast Asia; India, Bhutan, Nepal, Afghanistan, and Pakistan in South Asia; Tajikistan, Kyrgyzstan and Kazakhstan in Central Asia; and Russia, Mongolia, and North Korea in Inner Asia and Northeast Asia. It is narrowly separated from Bangladesh and Thailand to the southwest and south, and has several maritime neighbors such as Japan, Philippines, Malaysia, and Indonesia.

Politics 

The Chinese constitution states that the People's Republic of China "is a socialist state governed by a people's democratic dictatorship that is led by the working class and based on an alliance of workers and peasants," and that the state institutions "shall practice the principle of democratic centralism." The PRC is one of the world's only socialist states governed by a communist party. The Chinese government has been variously described as communist and socialist, but also as authoritarian and corporatist, with amongst the heaviest restrictions worldwide in many areas, most notably against free access to the Internet, freedom of the press, freedom of assembly, the right to have children, free formation of social organizations and freedom of religion.

Although the Chinese Communist Party describes China as a "socialist consultative democracy", the country is commonly described as an authoritarian one-party surveillance state and a dictatorship. China has consistently been ranked amongst the lowest as an "authoritarian regime" by the Economist Intelligence Unit's Democracy Index, ranking at 156th out of 167 countries in 2022. Its current political, ideological and economic system has been termed by its leaders as a "whole-process people's democracy" "people's democratic dictatorship", "socialism with Chinese characteristics" (which is Marxism adapted to Chinese circumstances) and the "socialist market economy" respectively.

Political concerns in China include the growing gap between rich and poor and government corruption. Nonetheless, the level of public support for the government and its management of the nation is high, with 80–95% of Chinese citizens expressing satisfaction with the central government, according to a 2011 Harvard University survey. A 2020 survey from the Canadian Institutes of Health Research also had most Chinese expressing satisfaction with the government on information dissemination and delivery of daily necessities during the COVID-19 pandemic. A Harvard University survey published in July 2020 found that citizen satisfaction with the government had increased since 2003, also rating China's government as more effective and capable than ever before in the survey's history.

Chinese Communist Party 

The main body of the Chinese constitution declares that "the defining feature of socialism with Chinese characteristics is the leadership of the Chinese Communist Party (CCP)."  China is a one-party Marxist–Leninist state, wherein the CCP general secretary (party leader) holds ultimate power and authority over state and government and serves as the informal paramount leader. The current general secretary is Xi Jinping, who took office on 15 November 2012, and was re-elected on 25 October 2017. According to the CCP constitution, its highest body is the National Congress held every five years. The National Congress elects the Central Committee, who then elects the party's Politburo, Politburo Standing Committee and general secretary, the top leadership of the country. At the local level, the secretary of the CCP committee of a subdivision outranks the local government level; CCP committee secretary of a provincial division outranks the governor while the CCP committee secretary of a city outranks the mayor.

Since both the CCP and the People's Liberation Army (PLA) promote according to seniority, it is possible to discern distinct generations of Chinese leadership. In official discourse, each group of leadership is identified with a distinct extension of the ideology of the party. Historians have studied various periods in the development of the government of the People's Republic of China by reference to these "generations".

Government 

The nearly 3,000 member National People's Congress (NPC) is constitutionally the "highest state organ of power", though it has been also described as a "rubber stamp" body. The NPC meets annually, while the NPC Standing Committee, around 150 member body elected from NPC delegates, meets every couple of months. In what China calls the "people's congress system", local people's congresses at the lowest level are officially directly elected, with all the higher-level people's congresses up to the NPC being elected by the level one below. However, the elections are not pluralistic, with nominations at all levels being controlled by the CCP. The NPC is dominated by the CCP, with another eight minor parties having nominal representation in the condition of upholding CCP leadership. 

The president is the ceremonial head of state, elected by the NPC. The incumbent president is Xi Jinping, who is also the general secretary of the CCP and the chairman of the Central Military Commission, making him China's paramount leader. The premier is the head of government, with Li Qiang being the incumbent premier. The premier is officially nominated by the president and then elected by the NPC, and has generally been either the second or third-ranking member of the PSC. The premier presides over the State Council, China's cabinet, composed of four vice premiers and the heads of ministries and commissions. The Chinese People's Political Consultative Conference (CPPCC) is a political advisory body that is critical in China's "united front" system, which aims to gather non-CCP voices to support the CCP. Similar to the people's congresses, CPPCC's exist at various division, with the National Committee of the CPPCC being chaired by Wang Huning, one of China's top leaders.

Administrative divisions 

The People's Republic of China is constitutionally a unitary state officially divided into 23 provinces, five autonomous regions (each with a designated minority group), and four municipalities—collectively referred to as "mainland China"—as well as the special administrative regions (SARs) of Hong Kong and Macau. The PRC considers Taiwan to be its 23rd province, although it is governed by the Republic of China (ROC), which claims to be the legitimate representative of China and its territory, though it has downplayed this claim since its democratization. Geographically, all 31 provincial divisions of mainland China can be grouped into six regions: North China, Northeast China, East China, South Central China, Southwest China, and Northwest China.

Foreign relations 

The PRC has diplomatic relations with 175 countries and maintains embassies in 162. Since 2019, China has the largest diplomatic network in the world. In 1971, the PRC replaced the Republic of China (ROC) as the sole representative of China in the United Nations and as one of the five permanent members of the United Nations Security Council. China was also a former member and leader of the Non-Aligned Movement, and still considers itself an advocate for developing countries. Along with Brazil, Russia, India and South Africa, China is a member of the BRICS group of emerging major economies and hosted the group's third official summit at Sanya, Hainan in April 2011.

Many other countries have switched recognition from the ROC to the PRC since the latter replaced the former in the United Nations in 1971. The PRC officially maintains the one-China principle, which holds the view that there is only one sovereign state in the name of China, represented by the PRC, and that Taiwan is part of that China. The unique status of Taiwan has led to countries recognizing the PRC to maintain unique "one-China policies" that differ from each other; some countries  explicitly recognize the PRC's claim over Taiwan, while others, including the US and Japan, only acknowledge the claim. Chinese officials have protested on numerous occasions when foreign countries have made diplomatic overtures to Taiwan, especially in the matter of armament sales.

Much of current Chinese foreign policy is reportedly based on Premier Zhou Enlai's Five Principles of Peaceful Coexistence, and is also driven by the concept of "harmony without uniformity", which encourages diplomatic relations between states despite ideological differences. This policy may have led China to support states that are regarded as dangerous or repressive by Western nations, such as Zimbabwe, North Korea and Iran. China has a close economic and military relationship with Russia, and the two states often vote in unison in the United Nations Security Council.

Trade relations 

China became the world's largest trading nation in 2013 as measured by the sum of imports and exports, as well as the world's largest commodity importer. comprising roughly 45% of maritime's dry-bulk market.
By 2016, China was the largest trading partner of 124 other countries. China is the largest trading partner for the ASEAN nations, with a total trade value of $345.8 billion in 2015 accounting for 15.2% of ASEAN's total trade. ASEAN is also China's largest trading partner. In 2020, China became the largest trading partner of the European Union for goods, with the total value of goods trade reaching nearly $700 billion. China, along with ASEAN, Japan, South Korea, Australia and New Zealand, is a member of the Regional Comprehensive Economic Partnership, the world's largest free-trade area covering 30% of the world's population and economic output. China became a member of the World Trade Organization (WTO) in 2001. In 2004, it proposed an entirely new East Asia Summit (EAS) framework as a forum for regional security issues. The EAS, which includes ASEAN Plus Three, India, Australia and New Zealand, held its inaugural summit in 2005.

China has had a long and complex trade relationship with the United States. In 2000, the United States Congress approved "permanent normal trade relations" (PNTR) with China, allowing Chinese exports in at the same low tariffs as goods from most other countries. China has a significant trade surplus with the United States, its most important export market. Economists have argued that the renminbi is undervalued, due to currency intervention from the Chinese government, giving China an unfair trade advantage. In August 2019, the United States Department of the Treasury designated China as a "currency manipulator", later reversing the decision in January 2020. The US and other foreign governments have also alleged that China doesn't respect intellectual property (IP) rights and steals IP through espionage operations, with the US Department of Justice saying that 80% of all the prosecutions related to economic espionage it brings were about conduct to benefit the Chinese state. 

Since the turn of the century, China has followed a policy of engaging with African nations for trade and bilateral co-operation; in 2019, Sino-African trade totalled $208 billion, having grown 20 times over two decades. According to Madison Condon "China finances more infrastructure projects in Africa than the World Bank and provides billions of dollars in low-interest loans to the continent's emerging economies." China maintains extensive and highly diversified trade links with the European Union. China has furthermore strengthened its trade ties with major South American economies, and is the largest trading partner of Brazil, Chile, Peru, Uruguay, Argentina, and several others.

China's Belt and Road Initiative has expanded significantly over the last six years and, as of April 2020, includes 138 countries and 30 international organizations. In addition to intensifying foreign policy relations, the focus here is particularly on building efficient transport routes. The focus is particularly on the maritime Silk Road with its connections to East Africa and Europe and there are Chinese investments or related declarations of intent at numerous ports such as Gwadar, Kuantan, Hambantota, Piraeus and Trieste. However many of these loans made under the Belt and Road program are unsustainable and China has faced a number of calls for debt relief from debtor nations.

Territorial disputes

Taiwan 

Ever since its establishment after the Chinese Civil War, the PRC has claimed the territories governed by the Republic of China (ROC), a separate political entity today commonly known as Taiwan, as a part of its territory. It regards the island of Taiwan as its Taiwan Province, Kinmen and Matsu as a part of Fujian Province and islands the ROC controls in the South China Sea as a part of Hainan Province and Guangdong Province. These claims are controversial because of the complicated Cross-Strait relations, with the PRC treating the One-China Principle as one of its most important diplomatic principles.

Land border disputes 

China has resolved its land borders with 12 out of 14 neighboring countries, having pursued substantial compromises in most of them. As of 2023, China currently has a disputed land border with India and Bhutan.

Maritime border disputes 

China is additionally involved in maritime disputes with multiple countries over the ownership of several small islands in the East and South China Seas, such as Socotra Rock, the Senkaku Islands and the entirety of South China Sea Islands, along with the EEZ disputes over East China Sea.

Sociopolitical issues and human rights 

China uses a massive espionage network of cameras, facial recognition software, sensors, and surveillance of personal technology as a means of social control of persons living in the country. The Chinese democracy movement, social activists, and some members of the CCP believe in the need for social and political reform. While economic and social controls have been significantly relaxed in China since the 1970s, political freedom is still tightly restricted. The Constitution of the People's Republic of China states that the "fundamental rights" of citizens include freedom of speech, freedom of the press, the right to a fair trial, freedom of religion, universal suffrage, and property rights. However, in practice, these provisions do not afford significant protection against criminal prosecution by the state. Although some criticisms of government policies and the ruling CCP are tolerated, censorship of political speech and information, most notably on the Internet, are routinely used to prevent collective action.

A number of foreign governments, foreign press agencies, and non-governmental organizations have criticized China's human rights record, alleging widespread civil rights violations such as detention without trial, forced abortions, forced confessions, torture, restrictions of fundamental rights, and excessive use of the death penalty. The government suppresses popular protests and demonstrations that it considers a potential threat to "social stability", as was the case with the 1989 Tiananmen Square protests and massacre.

China is regularly accused of large-scale repression and human rights abuses in Tibet and Xinjiang, including violent police crackdowns and religious suppression. In Xinjiang, at least one million Uyghurs and other ethnic and religion minorities have been detained in internment camps, officially termed "Vocational Education and Training Centers", aimed at changing the political thinking of detainees, their identities, and their religious beliefs. According to the U.S. Department of State, actions including political indoctrination, torture, physical and psychological abuse, forced sterilization, sexual abuse, and forced labor are common in these facilities. The state has also sought to control offshore reporting of tensions in Xinjiang, intimidating foreign-based reporters by detaining their family members. According to a 2020 report, China's treatment of Uyghurs meets the UN definition of genocide, and several groups called for a UN investigation. Several countries have recognized China's actions in Xinjiang as a genocide.

Global studies from Pew Research Center in 2014 and 2017 ranked the Chinese government's restrictions on religion as among the highest in the world, despite low to moderate rankings for religious-related social hostilities in the country. The Global Slavery Index estimated that in 2016 more than 3.8 million people were living in "conditions of modern slavery", or 0.25% of the population, including victims of human trafficking, forced labor, forced marriage, child labor, and state-imposed forced labor. The state-imposed forced system was formally abolished in 2013, but it is not clear to which extent its various practices have stopped. The Chinese penal system includes labor prison factories, detention centers, and re-education camps, collectively known as laogai ("reform through labor"). The Laogai Research Foundation in the United States estimated that there were over a thousand slave labor prisons and camps in China.

Military 

The People's Liberation Army (PLA) is considered one of the world's most powerful militaries and has rapidly modernized in the recent decades. It consists of the Ground Force (PLAGF), the Navy (PLAN), the Air Force (PLAAF), the Rocket Force (PLARF) and the Strategic Support Force (PLASSF). Its nearly 2.2 million active duty personnel is the largest in the world. The PLA holds the world's third-largest stockpile of nuclear weapons, and the world's second-largest navy by tonnage. China's official military budget for 2022 totalled US$230 billion (1.45 trillion Yuan), the second-largest in the world. According to SIPRI estimates, its military spending from 2012 to 2021 averaged US$215 billion per year or 1.7 per cent of GDP, behind only the United States at US$734 billion per year or 3.6 per cent of GDP. The PLA is commanded by the Central Military Commission (CMC) of the party and the state; though officially two separate organizations, the two CMCs have identical membership except during leadership transition periods and effectively function as one organization. The chairman of the CMC is the commander-in-chief of the PLA, with the officeholder also generally being the CCP general secretary, making them the paramount leader of China.

Economy 

China has the world's second-largest economy in terms of nominal GDP, and the world's largest economy in terms of purchasing power parity (PPP). As of 2021, China accounts for around 18% of the world economy by GDP nominal. China is one of the world's fastest-growing major economies, with its economic growth having been consistently above 6 percent since the introduction of economic reforms in 1978. According to the World Bank, China's GDP grew from $150 billion in 1978 to $17.73 trillion by 2021. Of the world's 500 largest companies, 145 are headquartered in China.

China was one of the world's most most foremost economic powers throughout the arc of East Asian and global history. The country had one of the largest economies in the world for most of the past two millenia, during which it has seen cycles of prosperity and decline. Since economic reforms began in 1978, China has developed into a highly diversified economy and one of the most consequential players in international trade. Major sectors of competitive strength include manufacturing, retail, mining, steel, textiles, automobiles, energy generation, green energy, banking, electronics, telecommunications, real estate, e-commerce, and tourism. China has three out of the ten largest stock exchanges in the world—Shanghai, Hong Kong and Shenzhen—that together have a market capitalization of over $15.9 trillion, as of October 2020. China has four (Shanghai, Hong Kong, Beijing, and Shenzhen) out of the world's top ten most competitive financial centers, which is more than any country in the 2020 Global Financial Centres Index. By 2035, China's four cities (Shanghai, Beijing, Guangzhou and Shenzhen) are projected to be among the global top ten largest cities by nominal GDP according to a report by Oxford Economics.

Modern-day China is often described as an example of state capitalism or party-state capitalism. In 1992, Jiang Zemin termed the country a socialist market economy. Others have described it as a form of Marxism–Leninism adapted to co-exist with global capitalism. The state dominates in strategic "pillar" sectors such as energy production and heavy industries, but private enterprise has expanded enormously, with around 30 million private businesses recorded in 2008. In 2018, private enterprises in China accounted for 60% of GDP, 80% of urban employment and 90% of new jobs.

China has been the world's No. 1 manufacturer since 2010, after overtaking the US, which had been No. 1 for the previous hundred years. China has also been No. 2 in high-tech manufacturing since 2012, according to US National Science Foundation. China is the second largest retail market in the world, next to the United States. China leads the world in e-commerce, accounting for 40% of the global market share in 2016 and more than 50% of the global market share in 2019. China is the world's leader in electric vehicles, manufacturing and buying half of all the plug-in electric cars (BEV and PHEV) in the world in 2018. China is also the leading producer of batteries for electric vehicles as well as several key raw materials for batteries. China had 174 GW of installed solar capacity by the end of 2018, which amounts to more than 40% of the global solar capacity.

Wealth 

China accounted for 17.9% of the world's total wealth in 2021, second highest in the world after the US. It ranks at 65th at GDP (nominal) per capita, making it an upper-middle income country. China brought more people out of extreme poverty than any other country in history—between 1978 and 2018, China reduced extreme poverty by 800 million. China reduced the extreme poverty rate—per international standard, it refers to an income of less than $1.90/day—from 88% in 1981 to 1.85% by 2013. The portion of people in China living below the international poverty line of $1.90 per day (2011 PPP) fell to 0.3% in 2018 from 66.3% in 1990. Using the lower-middle income poverty line of $3.20 per day, the portion fell to 2.9% in 2018 from 90.0% in 1990. Using the upper-middle income poverty line of $5.50 per day, the portion fell to 17.0% from 98.3% in 1990.

From 1978 to 2018, the average standard of living multiplied by a factor of twenty-six. Wages in China have grown a lot in the last 40 years—real (inflation-adjusted) wages grew seven-fold from 1978 to 2007. Per capita incomes have risen significantly – when the PRC was founded in 1949, per capita income in China was one-fifth of the world average; per capita incomes now equal the world average itself. China's development is highly uneven. Its major cities and coastal areas are far more prosperous compared to rural and interior regions. It has a high level of economic inequality, which has increased in the past few decades. In 2018 China's Gini coefficient was 0.467, according to the World Bank.

As of 2020, China was second in the world, after the US, in total number of billionaires and total number of millionaires, with 698 Chinese billionaires and 4.4 million millionaires. In 2019, China overtook the US as the home to the highest number of people who have a net personal wealth of at least $110,000, according to the global wealth report by Credit Suisse. According to the Hurun Global Rich List 2020, China is home to five of the world's top ten cities (Beijing, Shanghai, Hong Kong, Shenzhen, and Guangzhou in the 1st, 3rd, 4th, 5th, and 10th spots, respectively) by the highest number of billionaires, which is more than any other country. China had 85 female billionaires as of January 2021, two-thirds of the global total, and minted 24 new female billionaires in 2020. China has had the world's largest middle-class population since 2015, and the middle-class grew to a size of 400 million by 2018.

China in the global economy 

China is a member of the WTO and is the world's largest trading power, with a total international trade value of US$4.62 trillion in 2018. China is the world's largest exporter and second-largest importer of goods. Its foreign exchange reserves reached US$3.1 trillion as of 2019, making its reserves by far the world's largest. In 2012, China was the world's largest recipient of inward foreign direct investment (FDI), attracting $253 billion. In 2014, China's foreign exchange remittances were $US64 billion making it the second largest recipient of remittances in the world. China also invests abroad, with a total outward FDI of $62.4 billion in 2012, and a number of major takeovers of foreign firms by Chinese companies. China is a major owner of US public debt, holding trillions of dollars worth of U.S. Treasury bonds. China's undervalued exchange rate has caused friction with other major economies, and it has also been widely criticized for manufacturing large quantities of counterfeit goods.

Following the 2007–08 financial crisis, Chinese authorities sought to actively wean off of its dependence on the U.S. dollar as a result of perceived weaknesses of the international monetary system. To achieve those ends, China took a series of actions to further the internationalization of the Renminbi. In 2008, China established the dim sum bond market and expanded the Cross-Border Trade RMB Settlement Pilot Project, which helps establish pools of offshore RMB liquidity. This was followed with bilateral agreements to settle trades directly in renminbi with Russia, Japan, Australia, Singapore, the United Kingdom, and Canada. As a result of the rapid internationalization of the renminbi, it became the eighth-most-traded currency in the world by 2018, an emerging international reserve currency, and a component of the IMF's special drawing rights; however, partly due to capital controls that make the renminbi fall short of being a fully convertible currency, it remains far behind the Euro, Dollar and Japanese Yen in international trade volumes. As of 2022, Yuan is the world's fifth-most traded currency.

Science and technology

Historical 

China was a world leader in science and technology until the Ming dynasty. Ancient Chinese discoveries and inventions, such as papermaking, printing, the compass, and gunpowder (the Four Great Inventions), became widespread across East Asia, the Middle East and later Europe. Chinese mathematicians were the first to use negative numbers. By the 17th century, the Western hemisphere surpassed China in scientific and technological advancement. The causes of this early modern Great Divergence continue to be debated by scholars.

After repeated military defeats by the European colonial powers and Japan in the 19th century, Chinese reformers began promoting modern science and technology as part of the Self-Strengthening Movement. After the Communists came to power in 1949, efforts were made to organize science and technology based on the model of the Soviet Union, in which scientific research was part of central planning. After Mao's death in 1976, science and technology were promoted as one of the Four Modernizations, and the Soviet-inspired academic system was gradually reformed.

Modern era 

Since the end of the Cultural Revolution, China has made significant investments in scientific research and is quickly catching up with the US in R&D spending. China officially spent around 2.4% of its GDP on R&D in 2020, totaling to around $377.8 billion. According to the World Intellectual Property Indicators, China received more applications than the US did in 2018 and 2019 and ranked first globally in patents, utility models, trademarks, industrial designs, and creative goods exports in 2021. It was ranked 11th in the Global Innovation Index in 2022, a considerable improvement from its rank of 35th in 2013. Chinese supercomputers have been ranked the fastest in the world on a few occasions; however, these supercomputers rely on critical components—namely processors—imported from outside of China. China has also struggled with developing several technologies domestically, such as the most advanced semiconductors and reliable jet engines.

China is developing its education system with an emphasis on science, technology, engineering and mathematics (STEM). It became the world's largest publisher of scientific papers in 2016. Chinese-born academicians have won prestigious prizes in the sciences and in mathematics, although most of them had conducted their winning research in Western nations.

Space program 

The Chinese space program started in 1958 with some technology transfers from the Soviet Union. However, it did not launch the nation's first satellite until 1970 with the Dong Fang Hong I, which made China the fifth country to do so independently. In 2003, China became the third country in the world to independently send humans into space with Yang Liwei's spaceflight aboard Shenzhou 5. , sixteen Chinese nationals have journeyed into space, including two women. In 2011, China launched its first space station testbed, Tiangong-1. In 2013, a Chinese robotic rover Yutu successfully touched down on the lunar surface as part of the Chang'e 3 mission. In 2019, China became the first country to land a probe—Chang'e 4—on the far side of the Moon. In 2020, Chang'e 5 successfully returned moon samples to the Earth, making China the third country to do so independently after the United States and the Soviet Union. In 2021, China became the second nation in history to independently land a rover (Zhurong) on Mars, after the United States. China completed its own modular space station, the Tiangong, in low Earth orbit on 3 November 2022. On 29 November 2022, China performed its first in-orbit crew handover aboard the Tiangong.

Infrastructure 
After a decades-long infrastructural boom, China has produced numerous world-leading infrastructural projects: China has the world's largest bullet train network, the most supertall skyscrapers in the world, the world's largest power plant (the Three Gorges Dam), the largest energy generation capacity in the world, a global satellite navigation system with the largest number of satellites in the world, and has initiated the Belt and Road Initiative, a large global infrastructure building initiative with funding on the order of $50–100 billion per year. The Belt and Road Initiative could be one of the largest development plans in modern history.

Telecommunications 

China is the largest telecom market in the world and currently has the largest number of active cellphones of any country in the world, with over 1.5 billion subscribers, as of 2018. It also has the world's largest number of internet and broadband users, with over 800 million Internet users —equivalent to around 60% of its population—and almost all of them being mobile as well. By 2018, China had more than 1 billion 4G users, accounting for 40% of world's total. China is making rapid advances in 5G—by late 2018, China had started large-scale and commercial 5G trials.

China Mobile, China Unicom and China Telecom, are the three large providers of mobile and internet in China. China Telecom alone served more than 145 million broadband subscribers and 300 million mobile users; China Unicom had about 300 million subscribers; and China Mobile, the largest of them all, had 925 million users, as of 2018. Combined, the three operators had over 3.4 million 4G base-stations in China. Several Chinese telecommunications companies, most notably Huawei and ZTE, have been accused of spying for the Chinese military.

China has developed its own satellite navigation system, dubbed Beidou, which began offering commercial navigation services across Asia in 2012 as well as global services by the end of 2018. Upon the completion of the 35th Beidou satellite, which was launched into orbit on 23 June 2020, Beidou followed GPS and GLONASS as the third completed global navigation satellite in the world.

Transport 

Since the late 1990s, China's national road network has been significantly expanded through the creation of a network of national highways and expressways. China has the world's largest market for automobiles, having surpassed the United States in both auto sales and production. A side-effect of the rapid growth of China's road network has been a significant rise in traffic accidents, though the number of fatalities in traffic accidents fell by 20% from 2007 to 2017. In urban areas, bicycles remain a common mode of transport, despite the increasing prevalence of automobiles – , there are approximately 470 million bicycles in China.

China's railways, which are state-owned, are among the busiest in the world, handling a quarter of the world's rail traffic volume on only 6 percent of the world's tracks in 2006. As of 2017, the country had  of railways, the second longest network in the world. The railways strain to meet enormous demand particularly during the Chinese New Year holiday, when the world's largest annual human migration takes place.

China's high-speed rail (HSR) system started construction in the early 2000s. By the end of 2020, high speed rail in China had reached  of dedicated lines alone, making it the longest HSR network in the world. With an annual ridership of over 2.29 billion passengers in 2019 it is the world's busiest. The network includes the Beijing–Guangzhou–Shenzhen High-Speed Railway, the single longest HSR line in the world, and the Beijing–Shanghai High-Speed Railway, which has three of longest railroad bridges in the world. The Shanghai Maglev Train, which reaches , is the fastest commercial train service in the world.

Since 2000, the growth of rapid transit systems in Chinese cities has accelerated. , 44 Chinese cities have urban mass transit systems in operation and 39 more have metro systems approved. As of 2020, China boasts the five longest metro systems in the world with the networks in Shanghai, Beijing, Guangzhou, Chengdu and Shenzhen being the largest.

There were approximately 229 airports in 2017, with around 240 planned by 2020. China has over 2,000 river and seaports, about 130 of which are open to foreign shipping. In 2017, the Ports of Shanghai, Hong Kong, Shenzhen, Ningbo-Zhoushan, Guangzhou, Qingdao and Tianjin ranked in the Top 10 in the world in container traffic and cargo tonnage.

Water supply and sanitation 

Water supply and sanitation infrastructure in China is facing challenges such as rapid urbanization, as well as water scarcity, contamination, and pollution. According to data presented by the Joint Monitoring Program for Water Supply and Sanitation of WHO and UNICEF in 2015, about 36% of the rural population in China still did not have access to improved sanitation. The ongoing South–North Water Transfer Project intends to abate water shortage in the north.

Demographics 

The national census of 2020 recorded the population of the People's Republic of China as approximately 1,411,778,724. According to the 2020 census, about 17.95% of the population were 14 years old or younger, 63.35% were between 15 and 59 years old, and 18.7% were over 60 years old. The population growth rate for 2013 is estimated to be 0.46%. China used to make up much of the world's poor; now it makes up much of the world's middle-class. Although a middle-income country by Western standards, China's rapid growth has pulled hundreds of millions—800 million, to be more precise—of its people out of poverty since 1978. By 2013, less than 2% of the Chinese population lived below the international poverty line of US$1.9 per day, down from 88% in 1981. From 2009 to 2018, the unemployment rate in China has averaged about 4%.

Given concerns about population growth, China implemented a two-child limit during the 1970s, and, in 1979, began to advocate for an even stricter limit of one child per family. Beginning in the mid-1980s, however, given the unpopularity of the strict limits, China began to allow some major exemptions, particularly in rural areas, resulting in what was actually a "1.5"-child policy from the mid-1980s to 2015 (ethnic minorities were also exempt from one child limits). The next major loosening of the policy was enacted in December 2013, allowing families to have two children if one parent is an only child. In 2016, the one-child policy was replaced in favor of a two-child policy. A three-child policy was announced on 31 May 2021, due to population aging, and in July 2021, all family size limits as well as penalties for exceeding them were removed. According to data from the 2020 census, China's total fertility rate is 1.3, but some experts believe that after adjusting for the transient effects of the relaxation of restrictions, the country's actual total fertility rate is as low as 1.1. In 2023, National Bureau of Statistics estimated that the population fell 850,000 from 2021 to 2022, the first decline since 1961.

According to one group of scholars, one-child limits had little effect on population growth or the size of the total population. However, these scholars have been challenged. Their own counterfactual model of fertility decline without such restrictions implies that China averted more than 500 million births between 1970 and 2015, a number which may reach one billion by 2060 given all the lost descendants of births averted during the era of fertility restrictions, with one-child restrictions accounting for the great bulk of that reduction. The policy, along with traditional preference for boys, may have contributed to an imbalance in the sex ratio at birth. According to the 2010 census, the sex ratio at birth was 118.06 boys for every 100 girls, which is beyond the normal range of around 105 boys for every 100 girls. The 2010 census found that males accounted for 51.27 percent of the total population. However, China's sex ratio is more balanced than it was in 1953, when males accounted for 51.82 percent of the total population.

Ethnic groups 

China legally recognizes 56 distinct ethnic groups, who altogether comprise the Zhonghua Minzu. The largest of these nationalities are the ethnic Chinese or "Han", who constitute more than 90% of the total
population. The Han Chinese – the world's largest single ethnic group – outnumber other ethnic groups in every provincial-level division except Tibet and Xinjiang. Ethnic minorities account for less than 10% of the population of China, according to the 2010 census. Compared with the 2000 population census, the Han population increased by 66,537,177 persons, or 5.74%, while the population of the 55 national minorities combined increased by 7,362,627 persons, or 6.92%. The 2010 census recorded a total of 593,832 foreign nationals living in China. The largest such groups were from South Korea (120,750), the
United States (71,493) and Japan (66,159).

Languages 

There are as many as 292 living languages in China. The languages most commonly spoken belong to the Sinitic branch of the Sino-Tibetan language family, which contains Mandarin (spoken by 70% of the population), and other varieties of Chinese language: Yue (including Cantonese and Taishanese), Wu (including Shanghainese and Suzhounese), Min (including Fuzhounese, Hokkien and Teochew), Xiang, Gan and Hakka. Languages of the Tibeto-Burman branch, including Tibetan, Qiang, Naxi and Yi, are spoken across the Tibetan and Yunnan–Guizhou Plateau. Other ethnic minority languages in southwest China include Zhuang, Thai, Dong and Sui of the Tai-Kadai family, Miao and Yao of the Hmong–Mien family, and Wa of the Austroasiatic family. Across northeastern and northwestern China, local ethnic groups speak Altaic languages including Manchu, Mongolian and several Turkic languages: Uyghur, Kazakh, Kyrgyz, Salar and Western Yugur. Korean is spoken natively along the border with North Korea. Sarikoli, the language of Tajiks in western Xinjiang, is an Indo-European language. Taiwanese aborigines, including a small population on the mainland, speak Austronesian languages.

Standard Mandarin, a variety of Mandarin based on the Beijing dialect, is the official national language of China and is used as a lingua franca in the country between people of different linguistic backgrounds. Mongolian, Uyghur, Tibetan, Zhuang and various other languages are also regionally recognized throughout the country.

Urbanization 

China has urbanized significantly in recent decades. The percent of the country's population living in urban areas increased from 20% in 1980 to over 60% in 2019. It is estimated that China's urban population will reach one billion by 2030, potentially equivalent to one-eighth of the world population.

China has over 160 cities with a population of over one million, including the 17 megacities as of 2021 (cities with a population of over 10 million) of Chongqing, Shanghai, Beijing, Chengdu, Guangzhou, Shenzhen, Tianjin, Xi'an, Suzhou, Zhengzhou, Wuhan, Hangzhou, Linyi, Shijiazhuang, Dongguan, Qingdao and Changsha. Among them, the total permanent population of Chongqing, Shanghai, Beijing and Chengdu is above 20 million. Shanghai is China's most populous urban area while Chongqing is its largest city proper, the only city in China with the largest permanent population of over 30 million. By 2025, it is estimated that the country will be home to 221 cities with over a million inhabitants. The figures in the table below are from the 2017 census, and are only estimates of the urban populations within administrative city limits; a different ranking exists when considering the total municipal populations (which includes suburban and rural populations). The large "floating populations" of migrant workers make conducting censuses in urban areas difficult; the figures below include only long-term residents.

Education 

Since 1986, compulsory education in China comprises primary and junior secondary school, which together last for nine years. In 2021, about 91.4 percent of students continued their education at a three-year senior secondary school. The Gaokao, China's national university entrance exam, is a prerequisite for entrance into most higher education institutions. In 2010, 24 percent of secondary school graduates were enrolled in higher education. This number increased significantly over the last decades, reaching a tertiary school enrolment of 58.42 percent in 2020. Vocational education is available to students at the secondary and tertiary level. More than 10 million Chinese students graduated from vocational colleges nationwide every year.

China has the largest education system in the world, with about 282 million students and 17.32 million full-time teachers in over 530,000 schools. In February 2006, the government pledged to provide completely free nine-year education, including textbooks and fees. Annual education investment went from less than US$50 billion in 2003 to more than US$817 billion in 2020. However, there remains an inequality in education spending. In 2010, the annual education expenditure per secondary school student in Beijing totalled ¥20,023, while in Guizhou, one of the poorest provinces in China, only totalled ¥3,204. Free compulsory education in China consists of primary school and junior secondary school between the ages of 6 and 15. In 2020, the graduation enrollment ratio at compulsory education level reached 95.2 percent, exceeding average levels recorded in high-income countries, and around 91.2% of Chinese have received secondary education.

China's literacy rate has grown dramatically, from only 20% in 1949 and 65.5% in 1979. to 97% of the population over age 15 in 2018. In the same year, China (Beijing, Shanghai, Jiangsu, and Zhejiang) was ranked the highest in the world in the Programme for International Student Assessment ranking for all three categories of Mathematics, Science and Reading.

As of 2021, China has over 3,000 universities, with over 44.3 million students enrolled in mainland China and 240 million Chinese citizens have received high education, making China the largest higher education system in the world. As of 2021, China had the world's second-highest number of top universities (the highest in Asia & Oceania region). Currently, China trails only the United States in terms of representation on lists of top 200 universities according to the Academic Ranking of World Universities (ARWU). China is home to the two of the highest ranking universities (Tsinghua University and Peking University) in Asia and emerging economies according to the Times Higher Education World University Rankings. As of 2022, two universities in Mainland China rank in the world's top 15, with Peking University (12th) and Tsinghua University (14th) and three other universities ranking in the world's top 50, namely Fudan, Zhejiang, and Shanghai Jiao Tong according to the QS World University Rankings. These universities are members of the C9 League, an alliance of elite Chinese universities offering comprehensive and leading education.

Health 

The National Health and Family Planning Commission, together with its counterparts in the local commissions, oversees the health needs of the Chinese population. An emphasis on public health and preventive medicine has characterized Chinese health policy since the early 1950s. At that time, the Communist Party started the Patriotic Health Campaign, which was aimed at improving sanitation and hygiene, as well as treating and preventing several diseases. Diseases such as cholera, typhoid and scarlet fever, which were previously rife in China, were nearly eradicated by the campaign.

After Deng Xiaoping began instituting economic reforms in 1978, the health of the Chinese public improved rapidly because of better nutrition, although many of the free public health services provided in the countryside disappeared along with the People's Communes. Healthcare in China became mostly privatized, and experienced a significant rise in quality. In 2009, the government began a 3-year large-scale healthcare provision initiative worth US$124 billion. By 2011, the campaign resulted in 95% of China's population having basic health insurance coverage. In 2011, China was estimated to be the world's third-largest supplier of pharmaceuticals, but its population has suffered from the development and distribution of counterfeit medications.

, the average life expectancy at birth in China is 76 years, and the infant mortality rate is 7 per thousand. Both have improved significantly since the 1950s. Rates of stunting, a condition caused by malnutrition, have declined from 33.1% in 1990 to 9.9% in 2010. Despite significant improvements in health and the construction of advanced medical facilities, China has several emerging public health problems, such as respiratory illnesses caused by widespread air pollution, hundreds of millions of cigarette smokers, and an increase in obesity among urban youths. China's large population and densely populated cities have led to serious disease outbreaks in recent years, such as the 2003 outbreak of SARS, although this has since been largely contained. In 2010, air pollution caused 1.2 million premature deaths in China.

The COVID-19 pandemic was first identified in Wuhan in December 2019. Further studies are being carried out around the world on a possible origin for the virus. Beijing says it has been sharing Covid data in "a timely, open and transparent manner in accordance with the law". According to U.S. officials, the Chinese government has been concealing the extent of the outbreak before it became an international pandemic.

Religion 

The government of the People's Republic of China officially espouses state atheism, and has conducted antireligious campaigns to this end. Religious affairs and issues in the country are overseen by the State Administration for Religious Affairs. Freedom of religion is guaranteed by China's constitution, although religious organizations that lack official approval can be subject to state persecution.

Over the millennia, Chinese civilization has been influenced by various religious movements. The "three teachings", including Confucianism, Taoism, and Buddhism (Chinese Buddhism), historically have a significant role in shaping Chinese culture, enriching a theological and spiritual framework which harks back to the early Shang and Zhou dynasty. Chinese popular or folk religion, which is framed by the three teachings and other traditions, consists in allegiance to the shen, a character that signifies the "energies of generation", who can be deities of the environment or ancestral principles of human groups, concepts of civility, culture heroes, many of whom feature in Chinese mythology and history. Among the most popular cults are those of Mazu (goddess of the seas), Huangdi (one of the two divine patriarchs of the Chinese race), Guandi (god of war and business), Caishen (god of prosperity and richness), Pangu and many others. China is home to many of the world's tallest religious statues, including the tallest of all, the Spring Temple Buddha in Henan.

Clear data on religious affiliation in China is difficult to gather due to varying definitions of "religion" and the unorganized, diffusive nature of Chinese religious traditions. Scholars note that in China there is no clear boundary between three teachings religions and local folk religious practice. A 2015 poll conducted by Gallup International found that 61% of Chinese people self-identified as "convinced atheist", though it is worthwhile to note that Chinese religions or some of their strands are definable as non-theistic and humanistic religions, since they do not believe that divine creativity is completely transcendent, but it is inherent in the world and in particular in the human being. According to a 2014 study, approximately 74% are either non-religious or practice Chinese folk belief, 16% are Buddhists, 2% are Christians, 1% are Muslims, and 8% adhere to other religions including Taoists and folk salvationism. In addition to Han people's local religious practices, there are also various ethnic minority groups in China who maintain their traditional autochthone religions. The various folk religions today comprise 2–3% of the population, while Confucianism as a religious self-identification is common within the intellectual class. Significant faiths specifically connected to certain ethnic groups include Tibetan Buddhism and the Islamic religion of the Hui, Uyghur, Kazakh, Kyrgyz and other peoples in Northwest China. The 2010 population census reported the total number of Muslims in the country as 23.14 million.

A 2021 poll from Ipsos and the Policy Institute at King's College London found that 35% of Chinese people said there was tension between different religious groups, which was the second lowest percentage of the 28 countries surveyed.

Culture and society

Since ancient times, Chinese culture has been heavily influenced by Confucianism. For much of the country's dynastic era, opportunities for social advancement could be provided by high performance in the prestigious imperial examinations, which have their origins in the Han dynasty. The literary emphasis of the exams affected the general perception of cultural refinement in China, such as the belief that calligraphy, poetry and painting were higher forms of art than dancing or drama. Chinese culture has long emphasized a sense of deep history and a largely inward-looking national perspective. Examinations and a culture of merit remain greatly valued in China today.

The first leaders of the People's Republic of China were born into the traditional imperial order but were influenced by the May Fourth Movement and reformist ideals. They sought to change some traditional aspects of Chinese culture, such as rural land tenure, sexism, and the Confucian system of education, while preserving others, such as the family structure and culture of obedience to the state. Some observers see the period following the establishment of the PRC in 1949 as a continuation of traditional Chinese dynastic history, while others claim that the Communist Party's rule has damaged the foundations of Chinese culture, especially through political movements such as the Cultural Revolution of the 1960s, where many aspects of traditional culture were destroyed, having been denounced as "regressive and harmful" or "vestiges of feudalism". Many important aspects of traditional Chinese morals and culture, such as Confucianism, art, literature, and performing arts like Peking opera, were altered to conform to government policies and propaganda at the time. Access to foreign media remains heavily restricted.

Today, the Chinese government has accepted numerous elements of traditional Chinese culture as being integral to Chinese society. With the rise of Chinese nationalism and the end of the Cultural Revolution, various forms of traditional Chinese art, literature, music, film, fashion and architecture have seen a vigorous revival, and folk and variety art in particular have sparked interest nationally and even worldwide.

Architecture 

Many architectural masters and masterpieces emerged in ancient China, creating many palaces, tombs, temples, gardens, houses, etc.The architecture of China is as old as Chinese civilization. The first communities that can be identified culturally as Chinese were settled chiefly in the basin of the Yellow River(黃河流域). Chinese architecture is the embodiment of an architectural style that has developed over millennia in China and has remained a vestigial source of perennial influence on the development of East Asian architecture. Since its emergence during the early ancient era, the structural principles of its architecture have remained largely unchanged. The main changes involved diverse decorative details. Starting with the Tang dynasty,  Chinese architecture has had a major influence on the architectural styles of neighboring East Asian countries such as Japan, Korea, and Mongolia. and minor influences on the architecture of Southeast and South Asia including the countries of Malaysia, Singapore, Indonesia, Sri Lanka, Thailand, Laos, Cambodia, Vietnam and the Philippines. Unfortunately, few ancient Chinese buildings survive today, but reconstructions can be made based on clay models, descriptions in contemporary texts, and depictions in art such as wall paintings and engraved bronze vessels.

Chinese architecture is characterized by bilateral symmetry, use of enclosed open spaces, feng shui (e.g. directional hierarchies),  a horizontal emphasis, and an allusion to various cosmological, mythological or in general symbolic elements. Chinese architecture traditionally classifies structures according to type, ranging from pagodas to palaces.

Chinese architecture varies widely based on status or affiliation, such as whether the structures were constructed for emperors, commoners, or for religious purposes. Other variations in Chinese architecture are shown in vernacular styles associated with different geographic regions and different ethnic heritages,such as the Stilt houses in the south, the Yaodong buildings in the northwest, the yurt buildings of nomadic people, and the Siheyuan buildings in the north.

Since the end of the Qing Dynasty, Western-style architecture has gradually become the mainstream architectural form in China, while Chinese-style architecture has gradually declined in the form of appearance.

Tourism 

China received 55.7 million inbound international visitors in 2010, and in 2012 was the third-most-visited country in the world. It also experiences an enormous volume of domestic tourism; an estimated 740 million Chinese holidaymakers traveled within the country in October 2012. China hosts the world's second-largest number of World Heritage Sites (56) after Italy, and is one of the most popular tourist destinations in the world (first in the Asia-Pacific).The number of domestic trips reached six billion in 2019.

Literature 

Chinese literature is based on the literature of the Zhou dynasty. Concepts covered within the Chinese classic texts present a wide range of thoughts and subjects including calendar, military, astrology, herbology, geography and many others. Some of the most important early texts include the I Ching and the Shujing within the Four Books and Five Classics which served as the Confucian authoritative books for the state-sponsored curriculum in dynastic era. Inherited from the Classic of Poetry, classical Chinese poetry developed to its floruit during the Tang dynasty. Li Bai and Du Fu opened the forking ways for the poetic circles through romanticism and realism respectively. Chinese historiography began with the Shiji, the overall scope of the historiographical tradition in China is termed the Twenty-Four Histories, which set a vast stage for Chinese fictions along with Chinese mythology and folklore. Pushed by a burgeoning citizen class in the Ming dynasty, Chinese classical fiction rose to a boom of the historical, town and gods and demons fictions as represented by the Four Great Classical Novels which include Water Margin, Romance of the Three Kingdoms, Journey to the West and Dream of the Red Chamber. Along with the wuxia fictions of Jin Yong and Liang Yusheng, it remains an enduring source of popular culture in the Chinese sphere of influence.

In the wake of the New Culture Movement after the end of the Qing dynasty, Chinese literature embarked on a new era with written vernacular Chinese for ordinary citizens. Hu Shih and Lu Xun were pioneers in modern literature. Various literary genres, such as misty poetry, scar literature, young adult fiction and the xungen literature, which is influenced by magic realism, emerged following the Cultural Revolution. Mo Yan, a xungen literature author, was awarded the Nobel Prize in Literature in 2012.

Cuisine 

Chinese cuisine is highly diverse, drawing on several millennia of culinary history and geographical variety, in which the most influential are known as the "Eight Major Cuisines", including Sichuan, Cantonese, Jiangsu, Shandong, Fujian, Hunan, Anhui, and Zhejiang cuisines. Chinese cuisine is also known for its width of cooking methods and ingredients, as well as food therapy that is emphasized by traditional Chinese medicine. Generally, China's staple food is rice in the south, wheat-based breads and noodles in the north. The diet of the common people in pre-modern times was largely grain and simple vegetables, with meat reserved for special occasions. The bean products, such as tofu and soy milk, remain as a popular source of protein. Pork is now the most popular meat in China, accounting for about three-fourths of the country's total meat consumption. While pork dominates the meat market, there is also the vegetarian Buddhist cuisine and the pork-free Chinese Islamic cuisine. Southern cuisine, due to the area's proximity to the ocean and milder climate, has a wide variety of seafood and vegetables; it differs in many respects from the wheat-based diets across dry northern China. Numerous offshoots of Chinese food, such as Hong Kong cuisine and American Chinese food, have emerged in the nations that play host to the Chinese diaspora.

Music 

Chinese music covers a highly diverse range of music from traditional music to modern music. Chinese music dates back before the pre-imperial times. Traditional Chinese musical instruments were traditionally grouped into eight categories known as bayin (八音). Traditional Chinese opera is a form of musical theatre in China originating thousands of years and has regional style forms such as Beijing opera and Cantonese opera. Chinese pop (C-Pop) includes mandopop and cantopop. Chinese rap, Chinese hip hop and Hong Kong hip hop have become popular in contemporary times.

Cinema 

Cinema was first introduced to China in 1896 and the first Chinese film, Dingjun Mountain, was released in 1905. China has the largest number of movie screens in the world since 2016, China became the largest cinema market in the world in 2020. The top 3 highest-grossing films in China currently are Wolf Warrior 2 (2017), Ne Zha (2019), and The Wandering Earth (2019).

Fashion 

Hanfu is the historical clothing of the Han people in China. The qipao or cheongsam is a popular Chinese female dress. The hanfu movement has been popular in contemporary times and seeks to revitalize Hanfu clothing.

Sports 

China has one of the oldest sporting cultures in the world. There is evidence that archery (shèjiàn) was practiced during the Western Zhou dynasty. Swordplay (jiànshù) and cuju, a sport loosely related to association football date back to China's early dynasties as well.

Physical fitness is widely emphasized in Chinese culture, with morning exercises such as qigong and t'ai chi ch'uan widely practiced, and commercial gyms and private fitness clubs are gaining popularity across the country. Basketball is currently the most popular spectator sport in China. The Chinese Basketball Association and the American National Basketball Association have a huge following among the people, with native or ethnic Chinese players such as Yao Ming and Yi Jianlian held in high esteem. China's professional football league, now known as Chinese Super League, was established in 1994, it is the largest football market in East Asia. Other popular sports in the country include martial arts, table tennis, badminton, swimming and snooker. Board games such as go (known as wéiqí in Chinese), xiangqi, mahjong, and more recently chess, are also played at a professional level. In addition, China is home to a huge number of cyclists, with an estimated 470 million bicycles . Many more traditional sports, such as dragon boat racing, Mongolian-style wrestling and horse racing are also popular.

China has participated in the Olympic Games since 1932, although it has only participated as the PRC since 1952. China hosted the 2008 Summer Olympics in Beijing, where its athletes received 48 gold medals – the highest number of gold medals of any participating nation that year. China also won the most medals of any nation at the 2012 Summer Paralympics, with 231 overall, including 95 gold medals. In 2011, Shenzhen in Guangdong, China hosted the 2011 Summer Universiade. China hosted the 2013 East Asian Games in Tianjin and the 2014 Summer Youth Olympics in Nanjing; the first country to host both regular and Youth Olympics. Beijing and its nearby city Zhangjiakou of Hebei province collaboratively hosted the 2022 Olympic Winter Games, making Beijing the first dual olympic city in the world by holding both the Summer Olympics and the Winter Olympics.

See also 

 Outline of China

Notes

References

Further reading 

 Farah, Paolo (2006). "Five Years of China's WTO Membership: EU and US Perspectives on China's Compliance with Transparency Commitments and the Transitional Review Mechanism". Legal Issues of Economic Integration. Kluwer Law International. Volume 33, Number 3. pp. 263–304. Abstract.
 Heilig, Gerhard K. (2006/2007). China Bibliography – Online . China-Profile.com.
 Jacques, Martin (2009).When China Rules the World: The End of the Western World and the Birth of a New Global Order. Penguin Books. Rev. ed. (28 August 2012). 
 Jaffe, Amy Myers, "Green Giant: Renewable Energy and Chinese Power", Foreign Affairs, vol. 97, no. 2 (March / April 2018), pp. 83–93.
 Johnson, Ian, "What Holds China Together?", The New York Review of Books, vol. LXVI, no. 14 (26 September 2019), pp. 14, 16, 18. "The Manchus... had [in 1644] conquered the last ethnic Chinese empire, the Ming [and established Imperial China's last dynasty, the Qing]... The Manchus expanded the empire's borders northward to include all of Mongolia, and westward to Tibet and Xinjiang." [p. 16.] "China's rulers have no faith that anything but force can keep this sprawling country intact." [p. 18.]

External links

Government 
 The Central People's Government of People's Republic of China

General information 
 China at a Glance from People's Daily
 Country profile – China at BBC News
 China. The World Factbook. Central Intelligence Agency.
 China, People's Republic of from UCB Libraries GovPubs

Maps 
 baidu maps
 Google Maps—China
 
 

 
 
Atheist states
BRICS nations
Chinese-speaking countries and territories
Communist states
Countries in Asia
East Asian countries
E7 nations
G20 nations
Member states of the Shanghai Cooperation Organisation
Member states of the United Nations
Northeast Asian countries
One-party states
Republics
States with limited recognition
States and territories established in 1949
Cradle of civilization